"Lavender" is a song by the British neo-progressive rock band Marillion. It was released as the second single from their 1985 UK number one concept album Misplaced Childhood. The follow-up to the UK number two hit "Kayleigh", the song was their second Top Five UK hit, entering the chart on 7 September 1985, reaching number five and staying on the chart for nine weeks. None of the group's subsequent songs have reached the Top Five and "Lavender" remains their second highest-charting song. As with all Marillion albums and singles between 1982 and 1988, the cover art was created by Mark Wilkinson.

Inspiration and composition

The song features a number of verses that are reminiscent of the folk song "Lavender's Blue". The song forms part of the concept of the Misplaced Childhood album.  Like "Kayleigh" it is a love song, but whereas "Kayleigh" was about the failure of an adult relationship, "Lavender" recalls the innocence of childhood:

The childhood theme also brought up the idea of utilising an old children's song and "Lavender" was an obvious contender as one of the original pop songs of its time.

The opening lines "I was walking in the park dreaming of a spark, when I heard the sprinklers whisper, shimmer in the haze of summer lawns" deliberately recall the title track of Mitchell's album The Hissing of Summer Lawns.

Unusually for a rock song from the mid-1980s, "Lavender" features a traditional grand piano rather than an electronic keyboard or electric piano. In the music video, keyboardist Mark Kelly is seen playing a Bechstein but the original sleeve notes of the Misplaced Childhood album state that a Bösendorfer was used for the recording.

On the album Misplaced Childhood, "Lavender" is a short track of barely two and a half minutes, forming part of a longer suite that continues into the likewise multi-portioned track "Bitter Suite", which repeats Lavender's musical motif at the end. In order to be suitable for a single release, the track therefore needed to be re-arranged and extended. As a result, the 7" version is significantly longer than the album version (3:40 as opposed to 2:27), whereas the 12" version – entitled "Lavender Blue" – is 4:18.

Legacy

The song features on several Marillion compilation albums, including A Singles Collection (1992), The Best of Both Worlds (1997) and The Best of Marillion (2003). A CD replica of the single was also part of a collectors box-set released in July 2000 which contained Marillion's first twelve singles and was re-issued as a 3-CD set in 2009 (see The Singles '82–88').

The song was used in the first episode of BBC black comedy Nighty Night during a scene in which Julia Davis performs a dance for Angus Deayton.

The song was used in Season 1, Episode 6 of Showtime's On Becoming a God in Central Florida, "American Merchandise," directed by Julie Anne Robinson.

Track listing

7" Single

Side A
"Lavender " — 3:40

Side B
"Freaks" — 4:10

12" Single

Side A
"Lavender Blue" — 4:20

Side B
"Freaks" — 4:10 
"Lavender " — 3:40

Marillion - The Singles "82-88"
"Lavender" – 3:40
"Freaks" – 4:10
"Lavender Blue" – 4:20

Personnel
Fish – vocals
Steve Rothery - guitars
Mark Kelly - keyboards
Pete Trewavas - bass
Ian Mosley - drums

Charts

Weekly charts

Year-end charts

References

External links 
 Music video on YouTube
 Live performance from 1987 on YouTube

1985 singles
Marillion songs
Rock ballads
Song recordings produced by Chris Kimsey
Songs written by Fish (singer)
1985 songs
EMI Records singles
Songs written by Mark Kelly (keyboardist)
Songs written by Steve Rothery
Songs written by Pete Trewavas
Songs written by Ian Mosley